The river Planquette is one of the small streams that flow from the plateau of the southern Boulonnais and Picardy, into the Canche.

The river rises at Planques and passes Fressin, Wambercourt, Cavron-Saint-Martin and joins the Canche at Contes.

See also
Schéma directeur d'aménagement et de gestion des eaux

References

External links
Carte Géologique de la France à l'échelle du millionième 6th edn. BRGM (2003) 
 Carte des bassins versants de la Canche et de la Ternoise
 Informations sur les atlas des zones inondables

Rivers of France
Rivers of the Pas-de-Calais
Rivers of Hauts-de-France